Gennadiy Leonidovich Trukhanov (Hennadiy Leonidovych Trukhanov; born 17 January 1965) is the mayor of Odesa. He has been named as part of a Ukrainian crime syndicate who laundered money through London by buying multi-million pound properties in the city.

Life
Gennadiy Trukhanov was born on 17 January 1965 in Odesa, which was then in the Ukrainian Soviet Socialist Republic, a part of the Soviet Union. After graduation, he was given the rank of lieutenant. He was an engineer that specialised in repairing and maintaining artillery. From 1986 until 1992, he served in the North Caucasus Military District. He retired from Armed Forces in 1992, after having attained the rank of captain. In 1993, he worked at a private security firm. In 2000, he worked at Lukoil. He started work at the office of Verkhovna Rada, the parliament of Ukraine, in 2004. He was elected to Odesa city council in 2005, and was re-elected in 2006. He served on various committees in the Odesa city council.

Member of the Verkhovna Rada

He was elected to the Verkhovna Rada as a representative of the Party of Regions in 2012. Amidst rising unrest in Ukraine in the aftermath of the 2014 Ukrainian revolution and the violent 2 May clashes in Odesa, he was elected mayor of the city on 25 May 2014.

Mayor of Odesa

In the 2015 Mayoral election of Odesa Trukhanov was reelected in the first round of the election with 52.9% of the vote.

The Panama Papers indicate that Trukhanov is a Russian citizen, despite Ukrainian law banning dual citizenship. Trukhanov denied the allegation. The Panama Papers also show that he has "a substantial business empire in Ukraine through companies registered in the British Virgin Islands", with a suburb of Moscow listed as his place of residence. Gennadiy Trukhanov, a man who trained members of the gang in "hand-to-hand combat and sniper shooting with high precision weapons", according to Ms Savino. He is now the mayor of Odesa.
The Paradise papers indicate that, according to the Italian state police Deputy Commissioner, he trained members of a Ukrainian criminal gang in "hand-to-hand combat and sniper shooting with high precision weapons". On 9 April, Eduard Gurwits, ex-mayor of Odesa, affirmed that Trukhanov possesses three foreign passports: two Russian and one Greek. Trukhanov in 2017, through a Russian court, annulled his Russian passport.

Trukhanov was detained at Ukraine's Boryspil International Airport on 14 February 2018 suspected of embezzlement of property through abuse of power.

In the July 2019 Ukrainian parliamentary election Trukhanov was placed in the top ten of the party list of Opposition Bloc. But the nationwide list of this party won 3.23% of the votes and thus did not overcome the 5% election barrier, keeping Trukhanov out of parliament.

In the 2020 Odesa local election Trukhanov was again a candidate for mayor of Odesa (nominated by Trust Deeds). Trukhanov defeated Mykola Skoryk of Opposition Platform — For Life in the second round of the mayoral election on 15 November 2020, 54.28% of the voters voted for him.

References

External links
Official website of Gennadiy Trukhanov 

1965 births
Living people
Politicians from Odesa
Mayors of Odesa
Party of Regions politicians
Seventh convocation members of the Verkhovna Rada
People of the 2014 pro-Russian unrest in Ukraine
Naturalised citizens of Russia
People who lost Russian citizenship
Recipients of the Order of Danylo Halytsky
Recipients of the Order of Merit (Ukraine), 3rd class
Recipients of the Order of Merit (Ukraine), 2nd class
Recipients of the Honorary Diploma of the Cabinet of Ministers of Ukraine